James Daly (August 15, 1844 County Westmeath, Ireland – March 20, 1892 New York City) was an American merchant and politician from New York.

Life
He attended Queen's College, in Galway. Then he emigrated to New York City, and became a merchant and broker.

He entered politics joining the Democratic Reform movement against the Tweed Ring.

Daly was a member of the New York State Assembly (New York Co., 14th D.) in 1874, 1875 and 1878.

He was a member of the New York State Senate (7th D.) from 1882 to 1887, sitting in the 105th, 106th, 107th, 108th, 109th and 110th New York State Legislatures.

He died on March 20, 1892, at his home at 174 Second Avenue, in New York City, of "heart failure, following an attack of the grip."

Sources
 Civil List and Constitutional History of the Colony and State of New York compiled by Edgar Albert Werner (1884; pg. 291, 374f and 377)
 Life Sketches of Government Officers and Members of the Legislature of the State of New York in 1875 by W. H. McElroy and Alexander McBride (pg. 169f)
 Sketches of the Members of the Legislatures in The Evening Journal Almanac (1883)
 SENATOR DALY'S RECORD in NYT on October 21, 1888
 OBITUARY; JAMES DALY in NYT on March 21, 1892

1844 births
1892 deaths
Democratic Party New York (state) state senators
Politicians from New York City
People from Galway (city)
People from County Westmeath
Democratic Party members of the New York State Assembly
19th-century American politicians